Robert Louis Challoner (3 October 1872 – 6 May 1955) was a rugby union player who represented for Australia.

Challoner, a number 8, was born in Stratford-upon-Avon and claimed a total of 1 international rugby caps for Australia. His debut game was against Great Britain, at Brisbane, on 22 July 1899 the second ever Test match played by an Australian national side

Early life
Robert attended Warwick School, and in fact was in the same school rugby side as Sidney Nelson Crowther, the first Old Warwickian to gain international honours for Great Britain. Robert, after leaving school, emigrated to Australia and represented New South Wales and later Australia in the second test against a touring Great Britain side in 1899. Due to funding constraints he was one of only six New South Wales players ( with Charlie Ellis, Hyram Marks, Lonnie Spragg, Peter Ward & Bob McCowan) selected to make the trip to Brisbane four weeks after the historic first Test. His performance in that match was noted as excellent by the press.

References

Australian rugby union players
Australia international rugby union players
1872 births
1955 deaths
People educated at Warwick School
Rugby union players from Stratford-upon-Avon
Rugby union number eights